Die Model WG may refer to:

 Die Model WG (Austrian TV series)
 Die Model WG (German TV series)